Persevere is the fourth studio album by Scottish folk rock duo The Proclaimers, released in 2001 on their own label Persevere Records, as a comeback album after seven years of low profile. The album's first single featured "There's a Touch", "A Land Fit for Zeros" and "They Really Do" (not included in the album).

Recording
The album was recorded in Minneapolis, Minnesota, United States at Mastermix Studios, their only studio album to be recorded outside of the United Kingdom. Recorded with a studio band featuring drummer Pete Thomas of Elvis Costello's Attractions and Allman Brothers' Chuck Leavell on keyboards, the album was produced by Chris Kimsey.

Release 
Released on 22 May 2001, Persevere saw distribution on CD through their own Persevere Records in the United Kingdom, and in the United States and Canada through Nettwerk Records.

Content and style

Musical style 
Mary Huhn of New York Post described Persevere stylistically as "roots-rock pop", and to feature "harmonies only brothers can create".

Lyrics and themes 
The song "Scotland's Story" drew parallels between historical migrations to Scotland and arrivals of more recent immigrants, while "One Too Many" and "Act of Remembrance" paid tribute to the Reids' deceased father.

Critical reception 

Persevere received some mixed reviews. AllMusic'''s Jon Azpiri remarked that although the album was "not likely to achieve the kind of success of their previous work", that it had "enough interesting material [...] to prevent [the band] from being placed in the "Where Are They Now?" file", and praised "There's a Touch" and "Land fit for Zeros" for having "the same goofy charm" as the group's biggest hit, "I'm Gonna Be (500 Miles)".

In 2001, Bill Holdship of Rolling Stone stated that "the new album is quite good, combining folk, soul, country and pop with the Fifties-styled melodic sensibilities of the brothers Reid", observing that the song "One Too Many" would "make The Eagles green with envy".

In Riverfront Times, Steve Pick was praising of the record, commenting that the band "have equaled the musical triumphs of Sunshine on Leith" and deliver "a series of snapshots that reveal the actual experience of life during middle age, when love is more complicated than it seems".

Danish music publication Gaffa commented that Persevere saw the band on "fine form". Entailing "Everybody's A Victim" and "Scotland's Story" to be "excellent songs" and "How Many Times" to be a "little pop gem", reviewer Peter Widmer opined that Persevere was "a fine album" which "should be heard".

Canadian media magazine Exclaim! lauded Persevere "a remarkable comeback album", full of "fresh, catchy, sentimental and charming" songs.

 Touring Persevere's release was celebrated in July 2001 by a day-long concert tour of pubs and bars in Greater Vancouver, Canada, sponsored by Shaftebury Brewing. The promotional tour for Persevere included an arena tour of the United States in August 2001 supporting the Canadian rock band Barenaked Ladies, and a concert for season ticket holders of soccer team Vancouver Whitecaps on 1 May 2002.

 Track listing 
All songs written by Craig and Charlie Reid.

"There's a Touch"
"Sweet Little Girls"
"A Land Fit for Zeros"
"How Many Times"
"One Too Many"
"That's When He Told Her"
"Scotland's Story"
"When You're in Love"
"She Arouses Me So"
"Everybody's a Victim"
"Don't Give It to Me"
"Heaven Right Now"
"Slowburner"
"Act of Remembrance"

 Chart 

 References 

 External links 
Review from Rolling Stone''

2001 albums
Nettwerk Records albums
The Proclaimers albums
Albums produced by Chris Kimsey